The Mazurkas, Op. 68, by Frédéric Chopin are a set of four mazurkas composed between 1827 to 1849 and posthumously published in 1855. A typical performance of all four mazurkas lasts around nine minutes.

Mazurka in C major, Op. 68, No. 1 (1830)
Mazurka in A minor, Op. 68, No. 2 (1827)
Mazurka in F major, Op. 68, No. 3 (1830)
Mazurka in F minor, Op. 68, No. 4 (1849, often regarded as Chopin's last composition, along with the Mazurka in G minor, Op. 67, No. 2)

References

External links 

Mazurkas by Frédéric Chopin
Compositions by Frédéric Chopin published posthumously